is a weekend supplementary Japanese school, based in the Columbus, Ohio metropolitan area.

The classes are held in Creekview Intermediate School, of the Marysville Exempted Village Schools District (MEVSD) in Marysville. The school office is located in Worthington.

History
It was established in 1979 in a private house. A basement was used as the first classroom. Area Japanese parents formally opened the school in April 1980, then only having elementary level classes, and the school started with three teachers and fourteen students. By 1989, the student count was 400.

It began renting from Worthington Estates Elementary School and Worthingway Middle School, both in Worthington, for elementary and secondary level classes, respectively, in April 1999. It began renting from Grandby Elementary School and McCord Middle School for elementary and secondary classes, respectively, in April 2003; both schools are in the city limits of Columbus.

As of 2013, the school had 37 employees and 555 students. The Japanese Ministry of Education, Culture, Sports, Science and Technology (MEXT) sent two of the employees to the school. As of 2014 there were about 550 students.

In March 2019, the hoshuko stopped the Worthington school rents due to the state of the contracts. From March 2020 the Japanese school was to rent space in Glacier Ridge Elementary School, in Dublin, of Dublin City Schools. From September 2021 the hoshuko began using a Marysville facility. Prior to the Marysville agreement, the Japanese school had done learning over the Internet.

Operations
The school holds its classes on Saturdays with 17 board members managing the school.

See also
 Japanese community of Columbus, Ohio

References

Further reading
  - Profile at CiNii. Profile at Google Books

External links
 Columbus Japanese Language School 

Asian-American culture in Ohio
Japanese-American culture
Schools in Columbus, Ohio
Education in Union County, Ohio
Columbus
1980 establishments in Ohio
Educational institutions established in 1980
Worthington, Ohio
Education in Franklin County, Ohio